MNB may refer to:

MNB (TV channel), a Mongolian public television channel
Merchants National Bank (disambiguation), several U.S. banks
Monday Night Baseball, a live game telecast of Major League Baseball
Mongolian National Broadcaster, a public service broadcaster in Mongolia
Moody National Bank, a bank in Galveston, Texas
Belgian National Movement, a World War II Belgian Resistance group
Hungarian National Bank (Magyar Nemzeti Bank), the Hungarian name of the central bank of Hungary
 Menadione Nicotinamide Bisulfite, a synthetic chemical compound – see Menadione